Nicola Jolly is a Scottish television presenter and former beauty pageant titleholder who won Miss Scotland, 2003 and competed in Miss World 2003.

Biography
Jolly has been a presenter for various television shows such as Sky, the BBC, and STV. Though much of her work is sport-related, Jolly has also presented a segment on the  Beslan crisis for Richard & Judy, appeared as a guest presenter on  This Week, and was a contestant on 'Celebrity Fear Factor. She has been a columnist for the Evening Express.

In addition to her work for television and other media, Jolly is also involved in promoting various charities. She is the face of the Cornerstone Cycle Challenge and has lent her support to a number of other charities, including Streetwork, the SSPCA, and CHAS.

Jolly has also participated in the Clipper Round the World Yacht Race

References

External links

Jolly's show reel
Cornerstone Community Care

Miss World 2003 delegates
Scottish television presenters
Scottish women television presenters
Living people
1981 births
Scottish beauty pageant winners